is a Japanese figure skater. He is the 2023 World Junior bronze medalist, 2022–23 Junior Grand Prix Final bronze medalist, the 2022 JGP Czech Republic champion, and the 2022 Japanese junior national champion.

Personal life 
Yoshioka was born on 15 December 2003 in Osaka, Japan.

Programs

Competitive highlights 
GP: Grand Prix; CS: Challenger Series; JGP: Junior Grand Prix

References

External links 
 

2003 births
Living people
Japanese male single skaters
Sportspeople from Hyōgo Prefecture